Francis "Coyote" Shivers is a Canadian-American musician and actor.

Music and acting
Shivers co-produced the first single for the band Shadowy Men on a Shadowy Planet. The B-side to that single, "Having an Average Weekend," became the theme to the television show The Kids in the Hall. He also co-produced the band's first two albums.

He also played guitar in the instrumental rock band Sharkskin. After a series of moves, he ended up in New York City, where he joined The Dave Rave Conspiracy, playing guitar for them. During this time, he appeared in the movies Empire Records and Johnny Mnemonic. He also made cameo appearances in Smut and Dirty Love. He continued playing music, eventually gathering a back-up band to create and record his first solo album on Mutiny Records, the self-titled Coyote Shivers with the assistance of Billy Ficca (Richard Hell, Television) and Jack Pedler on drums.

Toured briefly with British rock band Jagged Edge during 2000.

Shivers has released several limited edition CD singles and the five-song CD 1/2 A Rock & Roll Record. He also appeared in the movies Down And Out With The Dolls directed by Kurt Voss, and Girl In 3D directed by Luis Aira. He also made a string of cameo appearances in films playing "himself" and released the double CD Coyote Shivers Gives It To Ya. Twice.

Personal life
Shivers was married to model and singer Bebe Buell from 1992 to 1999. In 2000, he married actress Pauley Perrette. Perrette and Shivers separated in 2004 and obtained a divorce in 2006. Buell, Perrette, and ex-girlfriend Angela Garber all allege that Shivers has a pattern of physical, sexual and psychological abuse, stalking, and legal harassment. In 2008, the Los Angeles County Superior Court declared Shivers a vexatious litigant, thus barring him from filing any court actions without review by a judge who will ensure that the court action has legal merit and is not intended to harass or intimidate.

In March 2010, Shivers married Brazilian author and journalist Mayra Dias Gomes in a private ceremony in Las Vegas. They divorced in 2018.

On January 11, 2021, Shivers was censured by the Hollywood United Neighborhood Council "for his violation of the code of conduct that Neighborhood Council Board Members should treat other Board Members and members of the public with respect regardless of the other’s political affiliation."

Discography

Albums
 Coyote Shivers (1996) Mutiny 
 1/2 A Rock & Roll Record (1999) The Orchard (EP)
 Gives It To Ya. Twice (2004) Foodchain Records (double CD)

Soundtrack contributions
 Empire Records, 1995 (song "Sugarhigh")
 Time of Your Life, 1999 TV Series (song "Something Happens" in episode "The Time They Threw That Party")
 Down and Out with the Dolls, 2001 (theme song "I Wanna Remember Tonight")
 Girl in 3D, 2004

Filmography 
 Johnny Mnemonic, 1995
 Empire Records, 1995
 Smut, 1999
 Down and Out with the Dolls, 2001
 Girl in 3D, 2004
 Boys & Girls Guide To Getting Down, 2006

References

External links
 

Living people
Male actors from Toronto
Musicians from Toronto
Canadian male film actors
Vexatious litigants
Year of birth missing (living people)